Victor Livingston is an American film and television editor known for his work on documentaries. He majored in English at Cornell University in the 1960s before moving to San Francisco to pursue film, initially inspired by Joseph Strick's Ulysses. After dropping out of San Francisco State's film program, Livingston was hired as an apprentice editor on The Wanderers (1979). Livingston later became known for Crumb (1994), for which he was nominated an Eddie Award.

Partial filmography

Film
 Crumb (1994)
 Bukowski: Born into This (2003)
 You're Gonna Miss Me (2005)
 The Dungeon Masters (2008)

Television
 David Blaine: Street Magic (1996)
 Woodrow Wilson and the Birth of the American Century (2002)
 Real World (1994–2010), various episodes
 Starting Over (2005), several episodes
 Greensburg (2008), several episodes

Citations

References

External links
 

Living people
American film editors
Cornell University alumni
People from Los Angeles
San Francisco State University alumni
American television editors
Year of birth missing (living people)